The 2016 Donegal Senior Football Championship is the 94th official edition of the Donegal GAA's premier club Gaelic football tournament for senior graded teams in County Donegal. The tournament consists of 16 teams with the winner going on to represent Donegal in the Ulster Senior Club Football Championship.

Naomh Conaill were the defending champions after they defeated St Eunan's 0-11 to 0-10 in the previous years final however they relinquished their crown when losing to Kilcar at the Semi-final stage.

This was Bundoran Réalt na Mara's return to the senior grade after making the straight bounce back up from the I.F.C. since being relegated in 2014.

On 16 October 2016, Glenswilly claimed their 3rd S.F.C. title when defeating Kilcar in the final in MacCumhaill Park 1-10 to 0-12.

Glenfin were relegated to the 2017 I.F.C. after losing a replay of the Relegation final to Killybegs, and thus ending their 15-year stay in the top flight of Donegal football.

Team changes

The following teams changed division since the 2015 championship season.

To S.F.C.
Promoted from I.F.C.
 Réalt na Mara – (I.F.C. Champions)

From S.F.C.
Relegated to I.F.C.
 Cloich Cheann Fhaola

Format
The 2016 County Championship took the same format as the 2015 championship in which there was four groups of four with the top two qualifying for the quarter-finals. Bottom of each group play in relegation play-offs to decide which team is relegated the 2017 Intermediate championship.

Group stage

Group 1

Round 1:
 An Clochán Liath 2-11, 0-7 Réalt na Mara, An Clochán Liath, 14/5/2016,
 Ardara 0-8, 0-6 Glenswilly, Ardara, 15/5/2016,       

Round 2:
 Réalt na Mara 1-15, 0-13 Ardara, Bundoran, 27/8/2016, 
 Glenswilly 1-10, 0-10 An Clochán Liath, Glenswilly, 28/8/2016, 

Round 3:
 Réalt na Mara 0-7, 3-12 Glenswilly, Bundoran, 4/9/2016, 
 An Clochán Liath 0-17, 2-9 Ardara, An Clochán Liath, 4/9/2016,

Group 2

Round 1'
 St Eunan's 0-13, 1-10 Kilcar, O'Donnell Park, 15/5/2016, 
 St Michael's 2-13, 0-8 Killybegs, Dunfanaghy, 15/5/2016, 

Round 2
 St Eunan's 2-14, 1-6 Killybegs, Killybegs, 27/8/2016, 
 Kilcar 2-15, 0-7 St Michael's, Kilcar, 28/8/2016, 

Round 3
 Killybegs 0-7, 0-24 Kilcar, Killybegs, 4/9/2016, 
 St Michael's 2-14, 3-14 St Eunan's, Dunfanaghy, 4/9/2016,

Group 3

Round 1
 Malin 2-9, 1-9 Seán MacCumhaills, Connolly Park, 15/5/2016, 
 Naomh Muire 3-7, 0-11 Glenfin, Glenfin, 15/5/2016, 

Round 2
 Seán MacCumhaills 3-16, 1-10 Glenfin, MacCumhaill Park, 27/8/2016 
 Naomh Muire 1-8, 1-8 Malin, The Banks, 28/8/2016 

Round 3
 Seán MacCumhaills 4-10, 0-17 Naomh Muire, MacCumhaill Park, 4/9/2016, 
 Malin 2-20, 1-13 Glenfin, Malin, 4/9/2016,

Group 4

Round 1
 Naomh Conaill 1-11, 1-2 Termon, Glenties, 14/5/2016, 
 Gaoth Dobhair 2-12, 1-9 Four Masters, Gweedore, 15/5/2016, 

Round 2
 Termon 1-11, 0-9 Gaoth Dobhair, Termon, 27/8/16, 
 Four Masters 1-11, 5-12 Naomh Conaill, Pairc Tir Conaill, 28/8/16, 

Round 3
 Termon 2-13, 2-11 Four Masters, Termon, 4/9/2016, 
 Naomh Conaill 2-18, 0-11 Gaoth Dobhair, Glenties, 4/9/2016,

Knockout stage

Last Eight

Quarter-finals
 Kilcar 0-19, 0-4 Termon, MacCumhaill Park, 24/9/2016,
 Glenswilly 2-20, 1-14 Seán MacCumhaills, O'Donnell Park, 24/9/2016,
 Naomh Conaill 1-13, 1-8 St Eunan's, MacCumhaill Park, 25/9/2016,
 Malin 0-13, 1-8 An Clochán Liath, O'Donnell Park, 25/9/2016,

Semi-finals
 Kilcar 5-10, 1-11 Naomh Conaill, MacCumhaill Park, 2/10/2016,
 Glenswilly 0-9, 0-7 Malin, O'Donnell Park, 2/10/2016,

Final

Relegation playoffs

Relegation Semi-finals
 Four Masters 1-13, 0-7 Glenfin, Killygordon, 24/9/2016
 Ardara 1-9, 1-5 Killybegs, Dunkineely, 25/9/2016

Relegation final
 Killybegs 1-11, 2-8 Glenfin, O'Donnell Park, 15/10/2016,
 Killybegs 2-13, 1-6 Glenfin, O'Donnell Park, 22/10/2016, (Replay)

Ulster Senior Club Football Championship

References

Donegal Senior Football Championship
Donegal Senior Football Championship